Villaguay Aerodrome  is a public use airport serving  Villaguay, a city in the Entre Ríos Province of Argentina.

See also

Transport in Argentina
List of airports in Argentina

References

External links 
OpenStreetMap - Villaguay Airport
OurAirports - Villaguay Airport

Airports in Argentina
Entre Ríos Province